Events from the year 1724 in Canada.

Incumbents
French Monarch: Louis XV
British and Irish Monarch: George I

Governors
Governor General of New France: Philippe de Rigaud Vaudreuil
Colonial Governor of Louisiana: Jean-Baptiste Le Moyne de Bienville
Governor of Nova Scotia: John Doucett
Governor of Placentia: Samuel Gledhill

Births
 April 30 - Jean-Baptiste de La Brosse, Jesuit, priest, missionary, and professor (died 1782)

Historical documents
New York benefits politically and in trade from its law prohibiting sale to French of any goods wanted by Indigenous people

New York should not send forces to "farther country of Indians" as it might provoke French, and trade has increased by "gentle means"

British merchants say New York law against trading with French has reduced supply of furs imported and manufactures exported

Report of peace delegation sent to Canada

Six Nations ask "Eastern Indians" to end war against New England, but they answer "evasively" and Six Nations decline fighting them

"Greatest slaughter we have made upon them" - New Hampshire leader reports killing of 100 men, women and children at Nanrantsouak

"Victim of his own love and[...]zeal to maintain the Faith" - Death of Fr. Sébastien Rasles at Nanrantsouak (Note: "savage" used)

Lt. Gov. Dummer of Massachusetts gets Nova Scotia Council to list terms it wants in treaty to end war with Indigenous people

Gov. Philipps says Nova Scotia "upon so precarious a footing" that it can't be settled "till such time as fortresses shall be built"

"Indian Prisoners here were treated with all Humanity," but Nova Scotia Council would kill one Indigenous hostage to repay recent attacks

Witnesses testify that scores of Indigenous men, some from Saint John River, decided to come from Minas to attack Annapolis Royal

Acadian deputies "prevaricate" when questioned about Annapolis attack, but Council too weak to risk uprising if they are punished

To encourage compliance, Nova Scotia Council allows Catholic priest to move into province because he asked permission

Canso fishers suspect "a neighbouring Coloney" wants to end their exemption from duty on fish to preempt or ruin them

When Indigenous people gather "oker," Newfoundland settler kills one and wants "to keep the country allways clear of the Indians"

References

 
Canada
24
1720s in Canada